Laufach (in its upper course: Schwarzbach) is a river of Bavaria, Germany. It flows into the Aschaff near Hösbach.

See also
List of rivers of Bavaria

References

Rivers of Bavaria
Rivers of the Spessart
Aschaffenburg (district)
Rivers of Germany